The list of shipwrecks in 1925 includes ships sunk, foundered, grounded, or otherwise lost during 1925.

January

2 January

3 January

4 January

6 January

8 January

10 January

12 January

13 January

14 January

18 January

19 January

20 January

21 January

23 January

24 January

25 January

26 January

28 January

29 January

30 January

February

1 February

2 February

3 February

9 February

10 February

14 February

15 February

16 February

17 February

21 February

22 February

23 February

24 February

25 February

27 February

28 February

March

1 March

4 March

8 March

9 March

11 March

12 March

13 March

14 March

15 March

16 March

19 March

20 March

21 March

23 March

24 March

27 March

28 March

30 March

31 March

April

2 April

3 April

4 April

5 April

7 April

10 April

12 April

13 April

14 April

16 April

17 April

21 April

28 April

29 April

Unknown date

May

1 May

2 May

8 May

9 May

10 May

11 May

12 May

14 May

15 May

18 May

19 May

20 May

21 May

22 May

23 May

24 May

25 May

26 May

27 May

29 May

31 May

June

1 June

3 June

5 June

6 June

7 June

10 June

11 June

12 June

13 June

14 June

15 June

16 June

18 June

19 June

20 June

24 June

26 June

27 June

28 June

29 June

30 June

July

3 July

5 July

10 July

11 July

13 July

14 July

15 July

17 July

19 July

20 July

22 July

23 July

24 July

25 July

27 July

28 July

30 July

31 July

August

1 August

2 August

3 August

5 August

6 August

7 August

9 August

11 August

13 August

14 August

15 August

16 August

17 August

21 August

23 August

24 August

26 August

28 August

Unknown date

September

1 September

2 September

3 September

4 September

5 September

8 September

10 September

14 September

15 September

16 September

19 September

21 September

23 September

24 September

26 February

25 September

28 September

29 September

October

2 October

3 October

4 October

6 October

8 October

9 October

10 October

13 October

14 October

15 October

16 October

18 October

19 October

21 October

22 October

23 October

24 October

26 October

27 October

28 October

30 October

Unknown date

November

1 November

2 November

3 November

5 November

6 November

9 November

11 November

12 November

15 November

16 November

17 November

18 November

19 November

20 November

21 November

22 November

23 November

24 November

25 November

26 November

27 November

28 November

29 November

30 November

Unknown date

December

1 December

3 December

4 December

5 December

6 December

7 December

8 December

9 December

10 December

11 December

12 December

13 December

15 December

16 December

17 December

18 December

20 December

21 December

22 December

23 December

24 December

25 December

27 December

28 December

29 December

30 December

31 December

Unknown date

Unknown date

References

 
1925
Ships